Abraham Lincoln vs. Zombies is a 2012 American action comedy horror B movie directed by Richard Schenkman, with a screenplay by Schenkman based upon the story concept of Karl Hirsch and Lauren Proctor. Produced by The Asylum, and starring Bill Oberst Jr., the film was released direct-to-video on May 29, 2012, following its May 28 theatrical premiere screening at the Telfair Museum of Art Jepson Center in Savannah, Georgia.

In the tradition of The Asylum's catalog, the film is a mockbuster of the 20th Century Fox film Abraham Lincoln: Vampire Hunter.

Plot
After his mother Nancy Lincoln falls victim to an illness that requires her to be tied to her bed, vicious and cannibalistic, 10-year-old Abraham Lincoln sees his father Thomas Lincoln commit suicide at her bedside. Taking up a scythe, the distraught young Abe tells his mother that he loves her before beheading her. He then joins others in his community in containing a local zombie outbreak.

When an adult Abraham Lincoln has become President of a fracturing United States, he is apprised of rumors concerning a prominent Confederate stronghold. He is told that a regiment of 30 men had gone to Confederate Fort Pulaski to seize it from the Confederates and only one man returned barely alive. When questioning the survivor, Lincoln discovers the soldier has an illness that seems to bring corpses back to life. He then personally leads a team of the newly established secret service to accompany him in investigating the fort.

They get to the fort and are attacked by Confederate survivors led by General Stonewall Jackson as well as by several of the infected people. Abe kills one of his men who had been bitten by one of the infected and explains to the others in his party that if they are bitten or scratched by an infected person, or if an infected person's blood makes contact with their mouths or eyes, that they too will become infected and, within twenty-four hours, would no longer be considered "human". More are lost when attempting to investigate the surrounding neighborhood, and Abe encounters an old flame turned prostitute Mary Owens who is sheltering her help, including a young Theodore Roosevelt, daughter Sophia and prostitute Annika to protect them from the invasion.

The group makes their way back to the fort where Jackson refuses to kill the infected, believing them to only be sick and in need of care. He claims Lincoln's actions are only against the members of the Confederacy. Based on an old Bantu word he'd learned from his mother, Agent Brown names the infected persons "zombies". Pat Garrett volunteers to help Abe, and guides them to a nearby plantation that has farming implements and other weapons they can use to combat the threat.

When returning to the fort, Mary is splashed in the face with zombie blood and soon falls ill. Meanwhile, agent John Wilkinson protests the killing and asks to remain behind as the rest of the group heads into the township to kill off the infected. Being greatly outnumbered, only Abe, Theodore, and Sophia return when the others are slaughtered. Wilkinson, who is revealed to be a spy, plots to kill Lincoln while he is alone but changes his mind when he catches Abe praying, as in his mind prayer would ensure Lincoln's soul going to heaven. After being convinced by Pat Garrett that Lincoln is right and escape is unlikely, Stonewall shows Abe a secret cache of gunpowder. They then decide to use the explosive to blow up the fort after trapping and containing the zombies inside. When the fuse goes out, Stonewall ventures down alone to re-light it, but is over-run and killed by the zombies just after doing so. Abe and Brown escape just in time and the entire place goes up. Mary accepts her fate and goes off with Lincoln to die, much to Sophia's heartbreak.

Eighteen months later, Abe goes to visit Mary who had been in the care of a doctor investigating the illness in vain hope of finding a cure. As Abe cleans wounds caused by her restraining shackles, Mary grabs his hand, scratching his skin, infecting him (much to his horror), and forcing him to kill her. Knowing he is himself incurable, Abe requests that a message be sent to John Wilkinson, as earlier he had discovered that Wilkinson was actually John Wilkes Booth who had a plot to kidnap Lincoln in response to the end of the war and the Union the victor. The message gives Booth the information to know exactly where Lincoln would be the following night at the theater, thus leading to his assassination (purposely arranged by Lincoln to prevent another outbreak) at Booth's hands.

Cast
 Bill Oberst Jr. as Abraham Lincoln
Brennen Harper as 10-year-old Abraham Lincoln
 Chris Hlozek as Major John McGill
 Jason Hughley as Wilson Brown
 Jason Vail as John Wilkes Booth
 Don McGraw as General Stonewall Jackson
 Christopher Marrone as Pat Garrett
 Ron Ogden as Robert Chamberlin
 Chip Lane as Joshua Kearney
 Canon Kuipers as Young Theodore Roosevelt
 Kent Igleheart as Thomas Lincoln
 Rhianna Van Helton as Nancy Lincoln
 David Alexander as Edward Everett
 Bernie Ask as Edwin Stanton
 Debra Crittenden as Mary Todd Lincoln
 Kennedy Brice as Little Zombie Girl
 Claire Weinstein as Zombie Girl in the Closet
 Baby Norman as Mary Owens
 Hannah Bryan as Sophia
 Anna Fricks as Annika

Production
Casting took place in January 2012.  Using mostly local talent, filming began on January 28 in Savannah, Georgia. Originally the script was set to shoot at a fort in Tennessee, but Savannah and Fort Pulaski were subsequently chosen for location shooting of scenes where Lincoln confronts zombies who had overrun a Confederate stronghold.

Critical response
The choice of Bill Oberst Jr. in the lead role of Abraham Lincoln in Abraham Lincoln vs. Zombies has been praised, with criticisms otherwise aimed at the film's plot, supporting cast members, character development, and historical inaccuracies.

Jason Adams of JoBlo wrote that the film was what might be anticipated from The Asylum, in its being "extremely repetitive" and having a script filled with "terrible lines."  Adams stated that the actors "pretty much suck post-colonial wastewater", except for Bill Oberst Jr.  Scott Foy of Dread Central offered similar praise for Oberst's acting, but "overwritten dialogue scenes, wildly uneven pacing, and sometimes confusingly staged action scenes prevent Abraham Lincoln vs. Zombies from fully living up to its full potential."  KDVR reported that in the film, director Richard Schenkman had created "an enjoyable little movie that is juuussttt this close to being great camp".  Jessica Leigh Lebos of Connect Savannah wrote, "Abraham Lincoln vs. Zombies is terrible. In the best possible way."  Lebos said Bill Oberst Jr. "gives a believable turn as Lincoln-as-badass while imbuing the character with the president’s signature stalwart leadership; his Gettysburg Address is so compelling, you might forget you’re watching a monster movie."  Whitney Scott Bain of Starburst called Abraham Lincoln vs. Zombies "a sluggishly directed film from a weak script" but "aside from all the historical inaccuracies, laborious direction and bad script, it's Bill Oberest Jr's stand out performance as Abe Lincoln that steals the show. He's worth watching and he's what saves the picture."

See also
 Cultural depictions of Abraham Lincoln

References

External links 
 
 

2012 films
2012 comedy horror films
2012 action comedy films
2012 independent films
American action comedy films
American Civil War films
American zombie comedy films
2010s English-language films
American action horror films
American alternate history films
Fictional depictions of Abraham Lincoln in film
Cultural depictions of Pat Garrett
Cultural depictions of Theodore Roosevelt
Cultural depictions of John Wilkes Booth
Mockbuster films
American Civil War alternate histories
Films shot in Georgia (U.S. state)
The Asylum films
Films directed by Richard Schenkman
2010s action horror films
Films set in Georgia (U.S. state)
2010s American films